Audincthun is a commune in the Pas-de-Calais department in northern France.

Geography
A town located 20 miles (32 km) northeast of Montreuil-sur-Mer, at the junction of the D92 with the D133 road.

Population

Personalities
 Albert de Dion, French automobile manufacturer (de Dion-Bouton), is buried in the family vault here.

Sights
 The fifteenth century church of St. Pierre.
 The eighteenth century church of St. Nicholas.
 The Sainte-Soyette Chapel.
 A line of 13 wind turbines are on the hills above the commune.

See also
Communes of the Pas-de-Calais department

References

Communes of Pas-de-Calais